The Nyanga language (native name Kinyanga) is a language spoken by the Nyanga people in Kivu province, north-eastern Democratic Republic of the Congo. Speaker estimates range from 27,000 (Biebuyck & Matheene 1970) to 150,000 (1994 census). Many of the Nyanga speak Congo Swahili, the dominant regional lingua franca, as a second language. Nyanga is a Bantu language. Most of the (scarce) linguistic research conducted on Nyanga has been based on the materials published by Biebuyck and Mateene.

Nyanga literature is best known for the tales recorded by Daniel Biebuyck in 1956 and published in 1969 and 1970, including the Mwindo epic. This epic is titled after the main hero, Mwindo, a miraculously born Pygmy-like human being who possesses not only a magical sceptre but also the power of the word. It centers around Mwindo's travels and encounters during the search for his father.
In other Nyanga tales, the dog often plays an important role as a mythical animal, reflecting the importance of hunting dogs in Nyanga society.

References

Biebuyck, Daniel P. and Kahombo C. Mateene (ed. and transl.) (1969) The Mwindo epic from the Banyanga (Congo Republic). Berkeley: University of California Press.
Biebuyck, Daniel P. and Kahombo C. Mateene (1970) Anthologie de la littérature orale nyanga. Brussels: Classe des Sciences Morales et Politiques.
Kerremans, Richard (1980a) 'Réflexes bantous en Nyanga', Études linguistiques, 2, 1, 93-110.
Kerremans, Richard (1980b) 'Contribution du Nyanga a l'etablissement de cinq reconstructions tonales et a l'etude lexicale des langues de la zone J', in L. Bourquiaux (ed.) L'expansion bantoue, Actes du Colloque international du CNRS Viviers (France) - 4-16 avril 1977; vol. II, 415–420.
Matheene, Kahombo C. and Komwami Mateene (1994) 'Vocabulaire fondamental nyanga', Afrikanistische Arbeitspapiere, 39, 5-54.

 
Nyanga-Buyi languages
Languages of the Democratic Republic of the Congo